Letitia Jane Dean (born 14 November 1967) is an English actress. She is best known for her portrayal of Sharon Watts in the BBC soap opera, EastEnders. An original cast member from 1985 to 1995, she reprised the role from 2001 to 2006, and again from 2012 onwards.

Her other television roles include Grange Hill (1983–1984), Brookside (1984), The Hello Girls (1996–1998), and Lucy Sullivan Is Getting Married (1999–2000). In 2007, she participated in the fifth series of the BBC dance competition Strictly Come Dancing, finishing fourth. On stage, she starred in the West End production of High School Musical in 2008, and in the UK touring production of Calendar Girls in 2010.

Early life
Dean was born in Potters Bar, Hertfordshire to parents Leslie (a tailor) and Ellie Dean, in a cottage rented on the estate of English romantic novelist Barbara Cartland, known as Camfield Place. Dean has two older brothers.

Dean's family moved to the north Buckinghamshire village of Stoke Goldington near Newport Pagnell when she was three years old. She acquired a penchant for performing at an early age; both she and her older brother Stephen attended a local dance school, The Sylvia Mitchell School of Dance in, and they also performed a dance act together on stage.  This later prompted Dean's successful application to attend the Italia Conti Academy of Theatre Arts at ten years old, and later the Sylvia Young Theatre School in Marylebone, London, which has famously produced some of Britain's most familiar television and musical stars.

Career

Early career
Dean began performing professionally at the age of 12, when she was cast as "Pepper" in the hit stage musical, Annie, at London's Victoria Palace Theatre. A trained singer, she played the lead female, Sandy, in the stage musical Grease, and she also sang with a rock group called "The Young Uns", which toured the country supporting stage acts such as Bobby Davro and Tom O'Connor.

Between the ages of 13 and 17, Dean appeared in numerous television programmes, including: Love Story; Tales Out Of School; the Matthew Kelly sitcom Relative Strangers; Grange Hill, playing a student named Lucinda Oliver; (credited as Titia Dean) and the role of Dawn in the Channel 4 soap opera Brookside.

EastEnders
In 1984, Dean auditioned to play one of the original characters in BBC One's brand new soap opera, EastEnders—she was selected for an interview on the strength of a photograph alone. The creators of EastEnders, Tony Holland and Julia Smith, were looking for a "bouncy, attractive, oddly vulnerable young woman" to play the part of Sharon Watts, and out of the various applicants they had seen, only Dean had all of those qualities. Dean lied about her roots to get the part. As the casting directors were only looking for real 'East End' actors, she falsely claimed that she was born and brought up in Hackney, east London. The lie paid off and she got the part, clinching the deal because of her laugh, which Holland and Smith described as "the dirtiest in the world!"

Dean's character Sharon, the troubled and spoilt adopted daughter of landlords "Dirty" Den (Leslie Grantham) and Angie Watts (Anita Dobson), from the show's inception in 1985 until 1995 — Sharon becoming one of the most popular and long-running characters in the serial.

While appearing on EastEnders, Dean forayed into singing with her fellow EastEnders castmate, Paul Medford (who played Kelvin Carpenter). A song penned for the pair as part of a plotline in EastEnders (known as The Banned) prompted the BBC to release the song as a single. The song, "Something Outa Nothing", reached number 12 in the UK Singles Chart in November 1986.

Dean featured in one of the soap's most popular storylines, a love triangle featuring Sharon, her husband Grant Mitchell (Ross Kemp) and his brother Phil (Steve McFadden). The plot, nicknamed 'Sharongate', gave the soap one of its highest episode ratings in October 1994, watched by over 25.3 million viewers. A desire to pursue other acting roles prompted Dean to leave the soap in 1995.

Six years following her initial exit, Dean was lured back to EastEnders by producer John Yorke, where she reprised the role of Sharon from 2001 to 2006. In December 2004 the Sunday Mirror reported that executive producer Kathleen Hutchison offered to double Dean's salary from £150,000 a year to £300,000 a year, to persuade her to remain in the show, making her one of the highest paid actresses in British soap. Dean's character left the serial again in January 2006. Dean's exit was announced in August 2005 and an official EastEnders press report stated that she was merely taking a scheduled break and was due back on set later in 2006;  however, this did not happen, and in June 2006 the BBC denied press speculation that there were any immediate plans for her to return to the series.

In February 2012, producer Bryan Kirkwood announced that Dean would make a second return to EastEnders, having been absent for a period of six years. She made her return on 13 August 2012 after fleeing from her wedding to her fiancé John Hewland, with her son, Dennis Rickman Jr. and Phil Mitchell. She is one of three remaining original cast members, along with Gillian Taylforth and Jane Slaughter.

Other work
Away from EastEnders Dean has had various theatre and television roles. She starred in two series of the BBC drama The Hello Girls, set in a Derby telephone exchange in the 1960s; medical dramas Casualty and Doctors; the ITV police drama The Bill; romantic comedy Lucy Sullivan Is Getting Married, and the Channel 4 sitcom Drop the Dead Donkey as a weathergirl. She also starred in the 1995 film England, My England, which told the story of the musician and court composer Henry Purcell.

On stage, she starred as Nurse Fay in the Joe Orton comedy play, Loot, working alongside actor Michael Elphick. She also played a prostitute in the revival of Charles Dyer's 1960s play Rattle of a Simple Man at the Alexandra Theatre, Birmingham.

In 2007 Dean participated in the fifth series of the BBC celebrity dance contest, Strictly Come Dancing. She was partnered with the professional dancer, Darren Bennett. Dean and Bennett were voted out in the quarter-finals (week 10), one week before the semi-final. Commenting on her experience, Dean said "It's been incredible. I've got to thank [Darren Bennett] for all his patience, hard work, all the injuries. It's been wonderful." Dean was one of several celebrities who took part in the 2008 Strictly Come Dancing UK arena tour. She competed against former EastEnders stars, Louisa Lytton (Ruby Allen, 2005–2006, 2018–), and Matt Di Angelo (Deano Wicks, 2006–2008, 2014–2016). The tour began in January 2008 and visited various venues throughout the UK, with all the proceeds going to the Children in Need appeal.

In April 2008 it was announced that Letitia Dean would be starring in the stage show High School Musical as Ms Darbus. Dean commented, "It's a lovely opportunity for me [...] It's something completely different to anything I've ever done – doing an American accent and playing this kind of character." The production played at London's Hammersmith Apollo from June 2008 until 31 August 2008.

In January 2009, Dean released a fitness DVD entitled Letitia Dean's Lean Routine. She joined the cast of the stage production of Calendar Girls the same year, playing Cora (Miss July).

Pantomimes
As well as television and theatre work, Dean regularly appears in seasonal pantomimes—she and other EastEnders stars such as Steve McFadden are rumoured to have a special clause in their contracts that permits them time off from filming to star in a pantomime each year. In 2001 she starred as Snow White at the Orchard in Dartford; and in 2004 she starred in Jack and the Beanstalk at the Birmingham Hippodrome, alongside British comedians Joe Pasquale and Don Maclean. In 2006, Dean appeared as the wicked witch in Snow White and the Seven Dwarfs at the Deco, Northampton, taking over the role from her former EastEnders co-star, Gillian Taylforth, who pulled out due to ill health. December 2007 saw Letitia Dean appear as the Fairy godmother in Cinderella, at the Regent Theatre, Ipswich. December 2008 saw Letitia Dean appear as the Wicked Queen in Snow White and the Seven Dwarfs, At the Grove Theatre, in Dunstable and she played the role again at the Ashcroft Theatre in Croydon in 2009.

Awards
In 2004 Dean was nominated for the Best Actress Award at  The British Soap Awards, but lost out to Suranne Jones from Coronation Street. Fellow EastEnders actresses Jessie Wallace and Kacey Ainsworth were also nominated. She was also nominated in the category of Best Dramatic Performance for "Den's Return" but lost out to Mark Charnock of Emmerdale. At the 2005 Inside Soap awards, Dean was presented with the award for outstanding achievement as homage to her work in EastEnders. She was also nominated in the category of Best Couple (shared with Nigel Harman). In 2022, she won the Special Recognition award at  The British Soap Awards.

Personal life
Growing up in the public eye was hard for Dean, and the constant media attention on her appearance was especially tough. She says her self-confidence was damaged during this time, and this, as well as back pain, contributed to her decision to get a breast reduction in her teens. By her 30s she considered herself to be a lot more comfortable in her own skin, and far more relaxed about public interest than she used to be as a teenager, commenting: "I have stopped pleasing people – and I'm calmer and more self assured than I've ever been."

In 2001, Dean became engaged to jobbing actor Jason Pethers after knowing him for only a few months. They married in September 2002 at All Saints' Church in Marylebone. Her close friend and EastEnders co-star, Susan Tully, was a bridesmaid at the wedding. Many of Dean's fellow castmates from EastEnders (past and present) attended the wedding. After five years of marriage, it was announced in 2007 that Dean and Pethers had separated because Pethers was reluctant to have children.

Her older brother, Stephen J. Dean, is also a performer; they have appeared together on stage in several pantomimes. As well as acting, Dean is a keen singer (with a mezzo-soprano voice) and tap dancer. Dean currently lives in the Bedford village of Wootton.

In June 2022, when accepting an award at  The British Soap Awards, Dean revealed that her father had died and she dedicated the award to him.

Charity work
In 1997, Dean along with Susan Tully, were involved with the Third World charity, Plan International, and were sent to a remote village in Senegal to help highlight one of the organisation's aid projects — designed to bring running water to drought hit areas.

Filmography

Theatre

References

External links
 
 
 

1967 births
Living people
English soap opera actresses
English film actresses
English stage actresses
English women singers
People from Potters Bar
Alumni of the Sylvia Young Theatre School
English television actresses
Musicians from Hertfordshire
Actresses from Hertfordshire
BBC Records artists